Pagodulina pagodula is a species of minute land snail, a terrestrial pulmonate gastropod mollusk, or micromollusk, in the family Pagodulinidae, and the superfamily Pupilloidea. 

Pagodulina pagodula is the type species of the genus Pagodulina.

Subspecies
 Pagodulina pagodula altilis Klemm, 1939
 Pagodulina pagodula pagodula (Des Moulins, 1830)
 Pagodulina pagodula principalis Klemm, 1939

The genus and the species name both mean little pagoda, a reference to the shape of the shell.
Synonyms
 Pagodulina pagodula sparsa Pilsbry, 1924: synonym of Pagodulina sparsa Pilsbry, 1924 (basionym)
 Pagodulina pagodula var. subdola Gredler, 1856: synonym of Pagodulina subdola (Gredler, 1856) (original combination and rank)

Shell description
The shells of this snail species are minute, about 3 mm in height, barrel-shaped or skep-shaped, with a flared and somewhat ear-shaped aperture.

Distribution
The distribution of this species is Alpine. It occurs in the following countries:

 Poland – critically endangered in southern Poland 
 Slovakia

References

 Kerney, M.P., Cameron, R.A.D. & Jungbluth, J-H. (1983). Die Landschnecken Nord- und Mitteleuropas. Ein Bestimmungsbuch für Biologen und Naturfreunde, 384 pp., 24 plates.
 Sysoev, A. V. & Schileyko, A. A. (2009). Land snails and slugs of Russia and adjacent countries. Sofia/Moskva (Pensoft). 312 pp., 142 plates.
 Bank, R. A.; Neubert, E. (2017). Checklist of the land and freshwater Gastropoda of Europe. Last update: July 16th, 2017

External links
 

Pagodulinidae
Gastropods described in 1830
Molluscs of Europe
Taxa named by Charles des Moulins